Sampkhanda or Samphakanda  is a Hill station of Western Ghats located in Sirsi Taluk of Uttara Kannada District, Karnataka, India. State Highway 69 passes through this village. Sampakhanda is considered one of the coldest places in Karnataka during summer season.

Climate
Sampakhanda experiences Tropical Highland rainforest climate with plenty of rainfall and humid feel. The temperature often drops below 15 °C even in summer making one of the coldest place in Karnataka. In spite  of average high elevation,  relative humidity affects the climate because of ocean proximity. So, day time becomes hotter and nights becomes colder than usual weather at this elevation. The maximum temperature recorded is 40.2 °C and minimum temperature recorded is 3.2 °C. The average temperature here is 21.6 °C.Highly influenced by south west monsoon, This region records as one of the wettest place in the world and holds one of the place in UNESCO hottest hot spot " Western Ghats ". The average rainfall here is 5572mm.

Nature and Terrain
This village is surrounded by lush and dense forest. This type of forest comes under Tropical Evergreen Forest owned by Karnataka Forest Department,  Sirsi Division. The elevation in this region is uneven, it varies from 542m to 801m. This place also provides home to several Wild animals and is one of the Elephant Corridor region.

See also 
 Karwar
 Mangalore
 Sirsi

References

Hill stations in Karnataka